The 1970 County Championship was the 71st officially organised running of the County Championship. Kent won the Championship title.

Table
10 points for a win
5 points to each side for a tie
5 points to side still batting in a match in which scores finish level
Bonus points awarded in first 85 overs of first innings
Batting: 1 point for each 25 runs above 150
Bowling: 2 point for every 2 wickets taken
No bonus points awarded in a match starting with less than 8 hours' play remaining.
Position determined by points gained. If equal, then decided on most wins.
Each team plays 24 matches.

References

1970 in English cricket
County Championship seasons